Colin Ross may refer to:
 Colin Ross (composer) (1911–1993), British organist, composer, and musician
 Colin Ross (footballer) (born 1962), Scottish football midfielder
 Colin Ross (pipemaker) (1934–2019), English folk musician and maker of Northumbrian and Scottish smallpipes
 Colin Campbell Ross (1892–1922), Australian man hanged for murder but pardoned 86 years later
 Colin A. Ross (born 1950), American psychiatrist; clinician, researcher and author in the field of trauma related disorders